Anton Anchin (born 30 January 1990, Sterlitemak) is a Russian swimmer. At the 2012 Summer Olympics, he competed in the Men's 200 metre backstroke, finishing in 23rd place overall in the heats, failing to qualify for the semifinals.

References

Russian male swimmers
1990 births
Living people
Olympic swimmers of Russia
Swimmers at the 2012 Summer Olympics
Male backstroke swimmers
People from Sterlitamak
Sportspeople from Bashkortostan
20th-century Russian people
21st-century Russian people